Mighty Joe Moon is the second studio album by American rock band Grant Lee Buffalo, released in 1994 by Slash Records and Reprise Records.

Track listing

Personnel
Credits adapted from liner notes.

 Grant Lee Phillips – vocals, acoustic and electric guitar, banjo, dobro, mandolin, harmonica
 Paul Kimble – bass, piano, pump organ, electric organ, vocals
 Joey Peters – drum set, tumbuk, tambourine, tablas, maracas, marimba, shakers, acquired hunks of metal
 Greg Adamson – cello on "Mockingbirds"
 Greg Leisz – pedal steel guitar on "Lady Godiva and Me"

Charts

References

1994 albums
Grant Lee Buffalo albums